Daniel Caligiuri (born 15 January 1988) is a German professional footballer who plays as a midfielder for Bundesliga club FC Augsburg.

Club career
Born in Germany to an Italian father of partial Arbëresh descent and a German mother, Caligiuri began his professional career with SC Freiburg. Caligiuri made his Bundesliga debut for Freiburg on 7 November 2009, starting against VfL Bochum. He joined VfL Wolfsburg in 2013 after a solid season with Freiburg. On 19 March 2015, Caligiuri scored in the second leg of the round of 16 in the Europa League against Inter Milan.

On 30 May 2015, he played as Wolfsburg won the German Cup for the first time defeating Borussia Dortmund 3–1 at the Olympic Stadium, Berlin.

On 25 January 2017, Caligiuri was announced as joining Bundesliga rivals Schalke 04 on a three and a half year deal.

On 29 June 2020, Caligiuri joined FC Augsburg on a free transfer at the end of the 2019–20 season. He signed a three-year contract.

International career
Caligiuri is eligible to represent both Germany through being born there (and to a German mother), as well as Italy through having an Italian father. On 22 May 2015, Caligiuri expressed his desire to play for the country of his father's heritage, stating "I have always said that I will play for the national team which invites me first. And I have big hopes now to be part of the Italy squad."

On 31 May 2015, it was announced that Antonio Conte named Caligiuri alongside fellow débutant Nicola Sansone in his preliminary squad for the upcoming UEFA Euro 2016 qualifying match against Croatia, but he was dropped from the squad on 6 June.

Personal life
Caligiuri is of Italian Arbereshë descent. His older brother Marco is a former professional footballer, who last played for Greuther Fürth.

Career statistics

Honours 
SC Freiburg
 A-Junioren Bundesliga (South/Southwest): 2005–06
 German Under-19 Cup: 2005–06

VfL Wolfsburg
 DFB-Pokal: 2014–15
 DFL-Supercup: 2015

References

External links
 

1988 births
Living people
People from Villingen-Schwenningen
Sportspeople from Freiburg (region)
Citizens of Italy through descent
German people of Italian descent
German people of Albanian descent
Italian people of Arbëreshë descent
German footballers
Footballers from Baden-Württemberg
Association football midfielders
Bundesliga players
Regionalliga players
BSV 07 Schwenningen players
SC Freiburg players
VfL Wolfsburg players
FC Schalke 04 players
FC Augsburg players